Ragged Point may refer to:

 Ragged Point, Barbados, a village in Saint Philip Parish in Barbados
Ragged Point (California), a cape along the Big Sur coast in San Luis Obispo County, California
 Ragged Point Beach, Virginia, an unincorporated community in Westmoreland County, in the U. S. state of Virginia
 Ragged Point Light, a former screw-pile lighthouse located in the Potomac River on the eastern coast of the United States
 Ragged Point, a fishing community within Bayview, part of the town of Twillingate in the province of Newfoundland and Labrador, Canada